My Buddy: Etta Jones Sings the Songs of Buddy Johnson is an album by vocalist Etta Jones featuring songs written by Buddy Johnson which was recorded in late 1997 and released on the HighNote label the following year.

Reception

In his review on Allmusic, Michael G. Nastos states "On My Buddy: Songs of Buddy Johnson, Etta Jones pays tribute to the man who got her started back in 1944. She sings songs originally done by Ella Johnson (Buddy's sister, whom she subbed for) and Arthur Prysock, in her typical soulful, clear, sweet, high-pitched voice".

Track listing 
All compositions by Buddy Johnson
 "When My Man Comes Home" – 4:38
 "They All Say I'm the Biggest Fool" – 5:36
 "Save Your Love for Me" – 5:49
 "Let's Beat Out Some Love" – 4:08
 "Since I Fell for You" – 5:57
 "Baby I'm Yours" – 5:31
 "Fine Brown Frame" – 3:47
 "(I Wonder) Where Our Love Has Gone" – 4:59
 "Please Mr. Johnson" – 5:55
 "Hittin' on Me" – 5:28

Personnel 
Etta Jones – vocals
Houston Person – tenor saxophone 
Norman Simmons – piano
John Webber – bass
Kenny Washington – drums

References 

Etta Jones albums
1998 albums
HighNote Records albums
Tribute albums